Harold Arthur "Hale" Swanson (September 6, 1914 – April 9, 1990) was an American professional basketball player as well as minor league baseball player. He played in the National Basketball League for the Hammond Ciesar All-Americans in 1939–40 but did not score a point in two career games. In baseball, he played in the St. Louis Cardinals' farm system for seven different teams between 1937 and 1946.

References 

1914 births
1990 deaths
American men's basketball players
Baseball players from Illinois
Basketball players from Illinois
Cedar Rapids Raiders players
College men's basketball referees in the United States
Illinois Fighting Illini baseball coaches
Illinois Fighting Illini baseball players
Illinois Fighting Illini men's basketball players
Forwards (basketball)
Guards (basketball)
Hammond Ciesar All-Americans players
Jersey City Giants players
Madison Blues players
Minneapolis Millers (baseball) players
People from Chicago Heights, Illinois
Rochester Red Wings players
Rogers Reds players
Waterloo Red Hawks players